The Men's Defensive Player of the Year is an award for the top-tier basketball league in Iceland, the men's Úrvalsdeild.

All-time award winners
The following is a list of the all-time Úrvalsdeild Men's Defensive Player of the Year winners.

References

External links
Icelandic Basketball Federation Official Website 

European basketball awards
Úrvalsdeild karla (basketball)